Aladeen Younes(born 22 January 1996), commonly known as Alaadeen Salman, is an American-born Libyan football player who plays . His father, Salman Younes, is a former footballer who played for Michigan State University (spartans) in the United States.

Club career

Al Sadd

Early career
Aladeen started out with Al-Sadd club in 2008 in the youth academy. He came into Al Sadd's first team at the age of 17, His first appearance was in April 2015 scoring against Al-Shamal. He was called in 2014 to the Libyan national team U20 for the African nation cup. He played 4 games against Chad, Ivory Coast and Tunisia (Home and away game). They did not qualify for the African nations.

Personal life
Aladeen has a brother, Moatez younes who is a footballer who played with Atlético Malagueño in Spain from 2013 to 2015. Then he left to play with Tampa Bay rowdies in Florida. His father previously played for Michigan State University in the US. His father graduated from MSU and then did his master's degree in University of Michigan, Ann Arbor and did his Phd in Arizona State University. His mother comes from Libya. Younes has 2 sisters. He graduated in May 2014 from his school Qatar International School, and now attending an online college.

External links

References

Living people
1996 births
Soccer players from Arizona
Libyan footballers
Libyan expatriate footballers
Libya youth international footballers
American soccer players
American people of Libyan descent
Al Sadd SC players
Tampa Bay Rowdies 2 players
National Premier Soccer League players
Qatar Stars League players
Association football midfielders
Expatriate footballers in Qatar
Libyan expatriate sportspeople in Qatar